The letter Ɱ (minuscule: ɱ), called M with hook, meng, or emg, is a letter based on the letter M. Its minuscule ɱ is used to transcribe a voiced labiodental nasal in the International Phonetic Alphabet.

In Americanist phonetic transcription, the lowercase ɱ is used for transcribing a voiced labiodental nasal stop and the uppercase Ɱ for a voiceless labiodental nasal stop.

Use on computers
The majuscule and the minuscule are located at U+2C6E and U+0271 in Unicode, respectively.

The Unicode U+0271 is used as a currency symbol for Monero because it looks like a combination of a lowercase "m" and lowercase "j". Thus, it is used as a shorthand for the Esperanto word "moneroj".

References

Latin letters with diacritics
Phonetic transcription symbols